Anoopchand Khimchand Shah  is an Indian politician belonging to the Indian National Congress. He was elected to the Lok Sabha, lower house of the Parliament of India from Mumbai North.

References

External links
 Official biographical sketch in Parliament of India website

1934 births
Living people
India MPs 1984–1989
Lok Sabha members from Maharashtra
Indian National Congress politicians
Politicians from Mumbai
Indian National Congress politicians from Maharashtra